New European Ensemble is an ensemble, currently based in the Netherlands, that specializes in contemporary music.

About
New European Ensemble was founded in 2008 in The Hague. The group is made up of young soloists, chamber musicians and orchestral leaders from across Europe. The ensemble has received numerous accolades in the international press for its ‘contagious enthusiasm’ (Nutida Musik) and ‘excellent’ (Volkskrant) performances.

The group has performed in most of the Netherlands' major concert halls including Muziekgebouw aan 't IJ Amsterdam, Dr. Anton Philipszaal Den Haag and De Doelen Rotterdam. In 2010 the ensemble toured Sweden for the first time starting in  Västerås Concerthall with subsequent performances in Stockholm, Gothenburg and Malmö. In June/July 2011 they performed for the first time in the UK.

In November 2011 New European Ensemble was featured on Dutch National TV in the programme NTR Podium where they performed  Joey Roukens's piece  Mad Men.

The Swedish conductor Christian Karlsen was during 2009 until 2014 its artistic director.

Collaboration with Amnesty International 

In 2009, the New European Ensemble mounted a collaboration project together with Amnesty International for a performance of  Hans Werner Henze's monumental song cycle Voices. In this work from 1973, Henze set 22 poems about human rights and freedom of speech. These texts where combined with photos from Amnesty International's collection that portrays the human rights today. 
A large education project at the Hague University was also connected to the performances.

Saariaho Festival Den Haag

New European Ensemble initiated and produced a three-day festival in October 2011 around the Finnish composer Kaija Saariaho. The festival was a collaborative project with The Hague's major music organisations including the Residentie Orchestra, Dr. Anton Philipszaal, the Royal Conservatoire and Dag in the Branding. During the festival's seven concerts a large portion of Kaija Saariaho's most important works were performed. Also numerous works were performed in the Netherlands for the first time during the festival. The New European Ensemble performed Saariaho's complete works for large ensemble during three concerts.

Board of Patrons
Reinbert de Leeuw chief conductor ASKO|Schönberg
Tomas Tranströmer, poet, Winner of the Nobel Prize in Literature 2011.
Peter Sellars, stage director
Vladimir Mendelssohn
Jard van Nes, singer
Anders Hillborg, composer
Ed Spanjaard, chief conductor of the Nieuw Ensemble
Klas Torstensson, composer

External links
 Official webpage

Footnotes

Contemporary classical music ensembles
Dutch musical groups
Musical groups established in 2008
Chamber music groups